Sarajevo Disk is a record label founded and based in Sarajevo, Bosnia and Herzegovina in 1978 by Hanka Paldum, Muradif Brkić and Braco Đirlo. It became inactive in 2000 and began releasing music again in September 2012.

Artists

Sinan Alimanović
Adnan Ahmedic
Halid Bešlić
Hanka Paldum
Hari Mata Hari
Hari Varešanović
Hašim Kučuk Hoki
Mile Kitić
Neda Ukraden
Šaban Šaulić
Šerif Konjević
Toma Zdravković
Vatreni Poljubac
Zaim Imamović
Zlata Petrović
Salem Sihirlić

References

External links
Sarajevo Disk at Discogs

See also
Sarajevo Diskoton

Record labels established in 1978
Companies based in Sarajevo
Bosnia and Herzegovina record labels